Tatiana Andreyevna Antoshina (born 27 July 1982) is a Russian road bicycle racer.

Career
She competed at the 2012 Summer Olympics in the women's road race, finishing 25th, and in the time trial, finishing 12th.

Doping case
On July 4, 2016, Antoshina was provisionally suspended by the UCI after a sample taken from May 31 had tested positive for GHRP-2. In May 2017, she was disqualified for four years – backdated to 31 May 2016 – with the suspension lasting until 3 April 2020.

Major results

Source:

2005
 3rd Time trial, National Road Championships
2006
 3rd Time trial, National Road Championships
2007
 1st  Time trial, National Road Championships
2008
 1st GP Jolenka
 2nd Time trial, National Road Championships
 2nd Giro del Valdarno
 4th Time trial, UCI Road World Championships
 4th Overall Trophée d'Or Féminin
 5th Overall La Route de France
 8th Overall Tour Féminin en Limousin
2009
 1st  Time trial, National Road Championships
 7th Time trial, UCI Road World Championships
2010
 National Road Championships
1st  Road race
1st  Time trial
 2nd Overall Giro della Toscana Int. Femminile – Memorial Michela Fanini
 4th Overall Gracia–Orlová
 4th Overall Tour Féminin en Limousin
 8th Overall Giro d'Italia Femminile
2011
 1st Overall Gracia–Orlová
 1st Overall Trophée d'Or Féminin
 2nd Overall Tour Féminin en Limousin
1st Stage 4
 2nd Tour of Flanders for Women
 3rd Time trial, National Road Championships
 4th Chrono des Nations
 5th Overall Giro d'Italia Femminile
 5th Overall Giro della Toscana Int. Femminile – Memorial Michela Fanini
2012
 3rd Time trial, National Road Championships
 3rd Open de Suède Vårgårda TTT
 4th Overall Gracia–Orlová
 6th Ronde van Gelderland
2013
 1st  Time trial, National Road Championships
 1st  Overall Tour Cycliste Féminin International de l'Ardèche
 1st Women's Bike Race Montignoso
 2nd Overall Tour Languedoc Roussillon
 2nd Overall Tour Féminin en Limousin
1st Stage 2
 2nd Overall Giro della Toscana Int. Femminile – Memorial Michela Fanini
 3rd Overall Giro del Trentino Alto Adige-Südtirol
 4th Overall Gracia–Orlová
 5th Overall Trophée d'Or Féminin
 8th GP de Plouay
 UCI Road World Championships
9th Time trial
10th Road race
 9th Overall La Route de France
2014
 National Road Championships
1st  Road race
1st  Time trial
 5th Chrono des Nations
2015
 1st  Time trial, National Road Championships
 1st Overall Tour de Feminin-O cenu Českého Švýcarska
1st Stage 3 (ITT)
 1st Ljubljana–Domžale–Ljubljana TT
 1st Chrono des Nations
 3rd Overall Tour de Bretagne Féminin
1st Stage 2 (ITT)
 European Games
4th Time trial
8th Road race
 4th Overall Gracia–Orlová
 6th Time trial, EPZ Omloop van Borsele
 10th Overall Giro della Toscana Int. Femminile – Memorial Michela Fanini
2016
1st  Time trial, National Road Championships
 5th Overall Gracia–Orlová
2021
 1st Grand Prix Develi
 3rd Time trial, National Road Championships

References

External links

Russian female cyclists
1982 births
Living people
Olympic cyclists of Russia
Cyclists at the 2012 Summer Olympics
Cyclists from Moscow
Cyclists at the 2015 European Games
European Games competitors for Russia
Doping cases in cycling
Russian sportspeople in doping cases
21st-century Russian women